Bandar Baru Bangi (literal translation: Bangi New Town) is a township situated in Hulu Langat District, in southeastern Selangor, Malaysia.

It is named after the small town of Bangi situated further south. It is located between Kajang and Putrajaya (formerly Prang Besar) and is about 25 km away from the capital city, Kuala Lumpur. Bandar Baru Bangi is also known as "Bandar Berilmu" or knowledgeable city since 2008 as numerous universities are located here including the National University of Malaysia.

The name of the town usually is abbreviated as "BBB". As of 2016, there are 16 town sections in the town.

Features

Bandar Baru Bangi is also known as a "Knowledge Town" as it is home to Universiti Kebangsaan Malaysia (National University of Malaysia). Other public universities including Universiti Tenaga Nasional and Universiti Putra Malaysia are also nearby.

It is also famous for its eateries. There are mamak stalls, sea food, Malaysian, Thai, Arabic as well as Japanese restaurants. There are several night markets, supermarkets, malls, and hotels in the town. Bangi Golf resort situated near section 6 is one of the largest golf resorts in Selangor state. The Bangi Town Centre was planned  together with a proposed town park for PKNS by Martin Jones the international urbanist and architect, and is now the major commercial centre of the new town of Bangi.

Educational institutions
Private schools:
 Sekolah Rendah Islam Pintar Tahfiz
 Institut Pintar Tahfiz Fuqaha (secondary school)
 SRI Ayesha
 Seri ABIM
 Sekolah Islam Sri Al-Amin
 Sekolah Rendah Islam Tahfiz Ilmuwan
 Sekolah Rendah Integrasi Islam BangiKu

Primary schools:
 Sekolah Kebangsaan Bandar Baru Bangi
 Sekolah Kebangsaan Jalan 3 Bandar Baru Bangi
 Sekolah Kebangsaan Jalan 4 Bandar Baru Bangi
 Sekolah Kebangsaan Jalan 6 Bandar Baru Bangi
 Sekolah Kebangsaan Seksyen 7 Bandar Baru Bangi
 Sekolah Jenis Kebangsaan Tamil West Country
 Sekolah Rendah Agama Integrasi Bandar Baru Bangi
Secondary schools:
 Sekolah Menengah Kebangsaan Bandar Baru Bangi
 Sekolah Menengah Kebangsaan Jalan 3 Bandar Baru Bang
 Sekolah Menengah Kebangsaan Jalan 4 Bandar Baru Bangi
 Sekolah Menengah Kebangsaan Jalan Reko
 SMKA Maahad Hamidiah Kajang

Higher education:
 Universiti Kebangsaan Malaysia (UKM)
 Universiti Putra Malaysia (UPM)
 Infrastructure University Kuala Lumpur (IUKL), formerly known as Kuala Lumpur Infrastructure University College (KLIUC)

Training centres
Bangi Government and Private Training Centre Area

Research centres
 Malaysian Nuclear Agency (formerly known as Malaysia Institute of Nuclear Technology Research (MINT))
 Malaysian Palm Oil Board (MPOB)

Industry
 Sony
 Hitachi
 DENSO
 Pepsi

Notable people 
 Lt. Adnan bin Saidi
 Azmyl Yunor
 Datuk Dr Mohd Fadzillah Kamsah
 Najib Razak

Transportation

Trains
The town is served by  KTM UKM station under the KTM Seremban Line. The station is located at Persiaran KWSP which is 1 km away from UKM area.

Buses 
The town is served by 4 routes from MRT Feeder Bus as well as 2 routes from Smart Selangor.

References

External links

 

Hulu Langat District
Townships in Selangor